Jérôme Lulling is a linguist from Luxembourg who has been a leading figure in preservation and educational efforts relating to the Luxembourgish language, a Germanic language that became one of Luxembourg’s three official languages in 1984 and is spoken by approximately 600,000 people worldwide.

Lulling’s initial contributions to enhancing the language took place between 2000 and 2002, when he compiled the language’s first computer spellchecker as part of his Ph.D. dissertation at the Université Paul Valéry de Montpellier. The spellchecker, which consisted of 125,000 words, was known as Projet C.ORT.IN.A.

Lulling, working in partnership with fellow linguists François Schanen and Manfred Peters, compiled and edited the first Luxembourgish-French dictionary, Dictionnaire Bilingue Français-Luxembourgeois, which was published in 2005. The text consisted of 48,000 translated words and phrases. Lulling is also the co-author of Luxdico, the Luxembourgish online dictionary. 

Lulling has also co-authored two academic papers relating to Luxembourgish: Eng Kleng Hëllef fir Lëtzebuergesch ze schreiwen (2001). and Introduction à l’orthographe luxembourgeoise.

In 2011 Lulling published a DVD to learn Luxembourgish called 'LuxDVD - learning luxembourgish with videos'.

References

External links
 www.JeromeLulling.lu official homepage
 Luxdico.com online translation dictionary French - luxembourgish (Lulling/Schanen) (2003- )
 www.Bonjour.lu videoclips to learn luxembourgish with Astrid and Jérôme Lulling

Year of birth missing (living people)
Living people
Linguists from Luxembourg